Liparus coronatus is a species of beetles belonging to the family Curculionidae.

Distribution
This species is  native to Europe.

Description

These rather uncommon small wevils are almost completely shiny black. . Pronotum is finely and densely punctured. The basal edge is lined with yellow scales throughout, with two large yellow scaly spots on each side. Femurs are  strong and pointed.

Biology
Adults of Liparus coronatus can be found from March to September. Larvae develop within rootstock. These wevils live on Apiaceae, mainly on chervil (Anthriscus sylvestris'), Rough Chervil (Chaerophyllum temulum), wild carrot (Daucus species), Carrot (Daucus carota) and Pastinaca species.

Bibliography
 Anderson, R., Nash, R., O’Connor, J.P. 2005. Checklist of Irish Coleoptera InvertebrateIreland Online, Ulster Museum, Belfast and National Museum of Ireland, Dublin
Freude, H., Harde, K.W., & Lohse, G.A. (eds, 1981, 1983) Die Käfer Mitteleuropas. Band 10. Bruchidae, Anthribidae, Scolytidae, Platypodidae, Curculionidae. Band 11. Curculionidae II. Krefeld: Goecke & Evers.
Hoffmann, A. (1950, 1954, 1958) Coléoptères curculionides. Parties I, II, III. Paris: Éditions Faune de France. Bibliothèque virtuelle numérique pdfs
Host Plants of British Beetles: A List of Recorded Associations, Bullock, J.A., 1992
Johnson, F.W & Halbert, J.N, 1902, A list of the Beetles of Ireland, Proceedings of the Royal Irish Academy, 6B: 535-827
Morris, M.G. 1993, A Critical Review of the Weevils (Coleoptera, Curculionoidea) of Ireland and their Distribution., Proceedings of the Royal Irish Academy, 93B: 69-84
True Weevils (Part I): Family Curculionidae, subfamilies Raymondionyminae to Smicronychinae, Morris, M.G., 2002

External link
 INPN
 Entomodena

References

Curculionidae
Beetles described in 1777
Beetles of Europe